Al Dabbah (also known as Ed Debba, El Debba, El Debbah or Ed Debbah) is a town on the river banks of the Nile, which is served by the Al Dabbah Airport. It has an estimated population of 52,000.

References

Populated places in Northern (state)